James Henry Richards (3 January 1855 – 24 August 1923) was an English cricketer. Richards' batting and bowling styles are unknown. He was born at Brixton, Surrey.

Richards made two first-class appearances for Surrey in 1881, against Middlesex at Lord's, and Lancashire at Old Trafford. In his first match, Surrey won the toss and elected to bat first, making 157 all out, with Richards scoring a single run before he was dismissed by Augustus Ford. Middlesex responded in their first-innings by making 192 all out, with Richards taking the wickets of A. J. Webbe and Isaac Walker to finish with figures of 2/40 from 28 overs. Surrey then made just 79 all out in their second-innings, with Richards being dismissed by James Robertson for a duck. This left Middlesex requiring just 45 for victory, which they reached without losing any wickets. In his second match, Lancashire won the toss and elected to bat first, making 324 all out, with Richards bowling fourteen wicketless overs. Surrey responded in their first-innings by making just 69 all out, with Richards being dismissed for 8 runs by Alexander Watson. Forced to follow-on in their second-innings, Surrey were dismissed for 130, with Richards dismissed for a duck by Dick Barlow. Lancashire won the match by an innings and 125 runs.

He died at Tulse Hill, London, on 24 August 1923.

References

External links
James Richards at ESPNcricinfo
James Richards at CricketArchive

1855 births
1923 deaths
People from Brixton
English cricketers
Surrey cricketers